Scincella ochracea  is a species of skink found in Vietnam.

References

Scincella
Reptiles described in 1937
Taxa named by René Léon Bourret